Gurgunta  also spelled as Guragunta is a village in the northern state of Karnataka, India. Gurgunta is famous for the ancient Amareshwara temple. It is located in the Lingasugur taluk of Raichur district in Karnataka. Karnataka National highway 150A passes through the village. This village is just 10 km away from Hutti Gold Mines, the unique primary gold producing company. This is also one of the hobli centre in Lingasugur taluka. This village consists of number of folds. most of the lands have been irrigated. Paddy is the major crop grown here. Remaining Non irrigated lands are grown by sun flower, cotton, toor, jawar etc. Major occupation is agriculture and small business. Huts and Mud roof houses are being replaced by RCC buildings. The famous Religious place Sri Gudagunti Amareshwara Temple is located near Gurgunta village. Before independence, Gurgunta was ruled by the Nayaka kings from 1636 to 1948. Around 16 Nayaka rulers have been ruled this state. In memory of this old fort and palace can be seen. This village consists of Grama Panchayat, Govt. P.U. College, High School, Primary School, RSK, Primary Health Centre, Veterinary dispensary, and hostel. Lord Venkateshwara Temple is located in the village. Navaratri Utsava (DASARA) is celebrated very nice. 9 days will be fully engaged in Bhajana and Purana functions. Moharam festival is also one of the famous festivals celebrated in the village. Gundlabandi Halla falls is small falls nearby 4 km.  Tinthini Mouneshwara Temple is a religious and pilgrim place located near 20 km from Gurgunta. Though this village is not having bus stand and daily travelling passengers suffering a lot during summer and rainy season.

Samsthana 
Gurugunta was chief town of small principality (Samsthana) of Naika's, liege lord of kanakagiri and shorapur. In the past, these lieges owned loyalty to Vijayanagara Kings or Adil shahs of Bijapur. Gurugunta samsthana continued till nizams hand overed to the district in 1949. 
16 Nayaka's were ruled from 16th to 19th Century. Fort and palaces are the evidence to their era.

Rajaguru Math

Gurugunta Nayaka's were admirer of saints, they addressed saints as their spiritual gurus & Sense of blessings from Sannyasi's lead Nayaka's to adopt their spirituality. Rajagurus were never stick around the capital or to the glorious constructions to communicate their influence. They were men of Proportionate philosophers with great wisdom. They favoured to stay secluded from the masses in the hermitages closer to the forests.

Since Rajagurus had simple style of living, Rajas identified the peace part in their locale & contributed the corner with classic construction to their monastic life in their ruling period. Later the construction was bound with Hindu mythological concept of Matha, many gurus have been part of spiritual evolution in the region of Gurugunta.
Untold truth was Many saints were entombed while alive (Jivantha Samadhi) in Matha, with this they contemplated to be in metaphysical form. locals claims that the current Rajaguru Matha was Nayaka's holy place and saints were defined as Gurus of Raja.

As an evidence Nayaka's Graveyards and Samadhi's of many saints can be witnessed in Rajaguru Matha.

The roots of their monastic life are still traceable here.

Demographics
 India census, Gurgunta had a population of 10207 with 5207 males and 5000 females. Gurgunta is situated on sh 19.

See also
 Maski
 Hatti
 Mudgal
 Raichur
 Districts of Karnataka

References

External links
 http://Raichur.nic.in/

Villages in Raichur district